Breaking Glass is the debut album by the English singer Hazel O'Connor. It is the soundtrack album to the film Breaking Glass, featuring songs written and performed by O'Connor who also stars in the film. It was released in 1980 by A&M Records. The album reached number 5 in the UK Album Charts, remaining on the chart for 38 weeks and was certified Gold by the British Phonographic Industry. Two of the musicians in her band, Bob Carter and Andy Duncan, were members of Linx.

Singles 
A total of five singles were released from the album, with the second single "Eighth Day", released in August 1980, becoming O'Connor's most successful, peaking at number 5 on the UK Singles Chart. "Will You?", released in May 1981 was also a Top-Ten hit. By the time the final single, "Calls the Tune" was released in January 1982, O'Connor had released a further two albums, Sons and Lovers and Cover Plus. Despite this, the single managed to chart at number 60 in the UK.

Reception 
Reviewing the album for Record Mirror, Simon Ludgate wrote "See the film before you buy this soundtrack and it'll make far more sense. The thing is, see, that on its own this is larger than life. Melodramatic, even." "The tracks are not in the order they crop up in the film and some work on their own, without the added visual stimulus, and some don't. Hazel has a peculiar singing technique which involves gulping air in a lot and opening your mouth as wide as possible. At least it's original... I like it." "The film has some scary overtones which are still here on this album and neither are recommended for the faint-hearted."

Reviewing for Smash Hits, Red Starr described it as an "utterly uninteresting and thoroughly unconvincing soundtrack album. Whatever Ms. O'Connor's true talents, they certainly do not include songwriting (here a relentless series of embarrassing obvious lyrical cliches with no real gift for melody) or singing (bad Lene Lovich impersonations being of distinctly limited appeal)."

Tour 
When O'Connor toured the UK to promote the album, she selected as her opening act a then-unknown group called Duran Duran which gave them the exposure to secure a recording contract with EMI. At the time, Duran Duran were so broke that one of their managers had to sell their flat to buy them a support slot on O'Connor's tour. They also could only afford one hotel room, so they took it in turns, whilst the other members slept outside in a van. Due to the differing music styles and fans between O'Connor and Duran Duran, O'Connor said that Simon Le Bon faced "abuse and people spitting on him every night". However, she also said "we could see they were going to do well" in the future.

Track listing

Charts

Personnel
Musicians

Hazel O'Connor – lead vocals, keyboards
Tony Visconti – vocals, keyboards
Bob Carter – guitars, keyboards, vocals
Wesley Magoogan – saxophones
Rick "Pinky" Ford – bass
Andy Duncan – drums, percussion

Technical
Tony Visconti – producer, arrangement, engineer
Kit Woolven – engineer
Gordon Fordyce – engineer
Chuck Beeson – art direction and design
George Whitear – photography
Recorded and mixed at Good Earth Studios, London

References

1980 debut albums
Albums arranged by Tony Visconti
Albums produced by Tony Visconti
A&M Records soundtracks
New wave albums by English artists